Andrea Howard (born February 10, 1947) is a former American actress who worked in film and television in the 1970s and 1980s.

Her more notable films include The Nude Bomb as Agent 22 (1980), and Thank God It's Friday as Sue (1978). Some of her notable television credits include the American daytime soap opera Santa Barbara as Veronica Gayley (1984–85) and the comedy series Holmes & Yoyo as Maxine Moon (1976–77).

Howard married her first husband at the age of eighteen and had two children from the marriage but was divorced by the age of twenty five. Her first job in the business was as a production assistant at Universal Studios and shortly after that made the change to acting. Andrea retired from acting in the early 1990s after a 20-year career. She then went into the real estate business with her second husband and also studied interior design. In later years Howard has owned a winery in Bennett Valley with her husband, and a bed and bath boutique store with her daughter,

She currently lives in Hilton Head Island South Carolina and in recent years (as of 2017) has been working there as a realtor.

Filmography

Television

Film

References

External links
 
 Santa Barbara Online

Living people
American television actresses
1947 births
20th-century American actresses
American film actresses
Actresses from Salt Lake City
People from Santa Rosa, California
21st-century American women